Gillian Kluane Muirhead Tanner  (13 March 1919 – 24 January 2016) was a British firefighter. Tanner was the only female firefighter to be awarded the George Medal during the Second World War.

Tanner was brought up in Gloucestershire but on 3 September 1939 at the outbreak of the Second World War she drove to London determined to play some part in the war effort. As Tanner held a driving licence for heavy goods vehicles (HGV), she joined the Auxiliary Fire Service (AFS) and was assigned to Dockhead fire station in Bermondsey, south-east London.  Tanner was given the duties of driving the petrol lorry and the canteen van, as she was the only driver at the station to have an HGV licence.  The petrol lorry was not a tanker but carried petrol in  containers from which other vehicles had to be refuelled by hand.

In September 1940 the bombing of London commenced and on 20 September the firefighters were dealing with numerous incidents. Tanner volunteered to go out in the petrol lorry during the blackout and an air raid to get to the docks to refuel the fire appliances. Avoiding bombs and bomb damage Tanner made it to the docks to deliver  for the refuelling of the appliances.  For this action Tanner was awarded the George Medal and the announcement of the award was made on 31 January 1941.  The citation read:

Following the award of the George Medal, Tanners portrait was painted by war artist, Alfred Thomson.

Tanner remained with the AFS and its successor, the National Fire Service (NFS), until after the end of the war. Post-war she continued to drive heavy lorries and also participated in rallying, driving in several major races during the 1950s.

In August 2022 two new fireboats joined the London Fire Brigade, one named after Tanner, and the other after fellow Second World War firefighter Harry Errington GC.

Personal life
Tanner was married twice. In 1945 she married Frank Armitage, an officer in the Durham Light Infantry. The divorced in the early 1950s and in 1954 she married John Wilton-Clark, remaining married to him until his death in 1995.  Tanner died in January 1996.

References

1919 births
2016 deaths
Recipients of the George Medal
British firefighters
Female rally drivers